The Oxfordshire Militia was a militia regiment in the United Kingdom from 1759 to 1881, when it was amalgamated into The Oxfordshire Light Infantry.

The regiment was organised in 1759. It was embodied in 1778, at which time it was ranked the 8th regiment of militia, and remained active for five years. It was regularly re-ranked through its embodiment, becoming the 16th in 1779, 14th in 1780, 17th in 1781, and 1st in 1782.

It was embodied again in 1793 for the French Revolutionary Wars, ranked as the 9th. With the resumption of hostilities in 1803, it was embodied as the 12th, and disembodied in 1816 following the peace.

In 1833, it was ranked as the 51st. It saw service during the Crimean War, being embodied in 1854 and volunteering for garrison service in the Mediterranean, being embodied again in late 1857 and finally disembodied in 1860.

In 1881, under the Childers Reforms, the regiment was transferred into The Oxfordshire Light Infantry as the 4th Battalion. This was embodied during the South African War in 1900, and disembodied in mid-1901.

During the Haldane Reforms in 1908 the battalion was transferred to the Special Reserve and redesignated the 3rd Battalion, and was embodied on mobilisation in 1914 for the First World War. As with all Special Reserve battalions, it served as a regimental depot, and was disembodied following the end of hostilities in 1919, with personnel transferred to the 1st Battalion. The battalion nominally remained in existence throughout the Second World War, but was never activated, and was finally disbanded in 1953.

References
Oxfordshire Militia, regiments.org

Bibliography

Infantry regiments of the British Army
Military units and formations established in 1759
Military units and formations in Oxfordshire
Military units and formations in Oxford
Military units and formations disestablished in 1881
Oxfordshire and Buckinghamshire Light Infantry